Chunchugwan was a government office during the Joseon dynasty. It refers to the office for recording history. During the Goryeo dynasty, it was known as Yemun Chunchugwan (예문춘추관; 藝文春秋館) or Munhanseo (문한서; 文翰署), but the name was changed in 1401 after the foundation of the Joseon dynasty.

History
Many people associate Chunchugwan with the Joseon dynasty era, but, in fact, Chunchugwan has existed since the Goryeo dynasty. It just begun to earn historical recognition from Joseon dynasty era.  It started to be called the Chunchugwan from the time of king Taejong of Joseon. It had been called Yemun or Chunchugwan during Goryeo era.

Task of Chunchugwan
Officers of Chunchugwan are made up of eight men. Their official rank is low, between Jeong 6-pum and Jeong 8-pum (정 6품/정 8품; 正六品/正八品), but they stay where the king is, for example, a royal progress, meeting with courtiers and attendance of morning assembly. They write Sacho (사초; 史草), recording popular sentiment and king's every movement. The Annals of the Joseon Dynasty is based on this recording.

Positions of Chunchugwan
There are no officers in Chunchugwan, because workers of other offices hold an additional position in Chunchugwan. Yeonguijeong take consul that is the leader of Chunchugwan, Uuijeong (the second vice-premier) and Jwauijeong take governor and workers of other offices take rest of office positions. There are Jeong 2-pum and Jong 2-pum (정 2품/종 2품; 正二品/ 從二品) that each of them is two people, Jeong 3-pum and Jong 3-pum (정 3품/종 3품; 正三品/ 從三品), and Jeong 5-pum and Jong 5-pum (정 5품/종 5품; 正五品/ 從五品) In Chunchugwan.

Modern incarnation
The name Chunchugwan is also applied to the building which houses the approximately 150 domestic and international correspondents who cover the Blue House, the official residence of the President of South Korea. The first and second floor of the building has a pressroom and briefing room, respectively. Presidential news conferences and daily briefings are held in the briefing room. This building was opened in 1990. Its traditional Korean gabled roof is covered with clay tiles to harmoniously blend in with the surrounding landscape. The name was chosen to emphasize fair criticism and strict objectivity in recording history.

See also
 Joseon dynasty
 Cheong Wa Dae
 Annals of the Joseon Dynasty

References 

Joseon dynasty
Korean culture